The Inside Story is a 1979 studio album by Robben Ford.

Track listing
All songs written by Robben Ford except where noted
"Magic Sam" – 5:53
"For the One I Love" – 4:22
"North Carolina" – 4:38
"There's No One Else" (Ford, Russell Ferrante) – 6:52
"The Inside Story" (Ford, Russell Ferrante) –  5:30
"Need Somebody" (Gordon Edwards, Richard Tee) 
"Far Away" – 5:40
"Tee Time for Eric" – 5:09

Personnel 
 Robben Ford – guitar, vocals; Roland electric piano on "Need Somebody"
 Alan Rubin – trumpet
 Tom Malone – trombone, baritone saxophone
 Lou Marini – alto saxophone, tenor saxophone, horn arrangements
 Russell Ferrante – synthesizer, ARP Odyssey and Moog synthesizer programming
 Steve Perry a.k.a. Stephen Sea – synthesizer
 Mark Ford – harmonica
 Jimmy Haslip – bass guitar
 Ricky Lawson – drums, percussion
 Vander "Starz" Lockett – percussion
 Tommy Vig – percussion
Technical
Larry Redhon - engineer
Ron Coro, Johnny Lee - art direction
Gary Heery - photography

References

Robben Ford albums
1979 albums
Albums produced by Steve Cropper
Elektra Records albums